The Rotherham by-election was held on 5 May 1994, following the death of Labour Party Member of Parliament for Rotherham Jimmy Boyce.

Boyce had won the seat only at the 1992 general election, but it had been continuously held by Labour since 1933, usually with a large majority.  As a result, Labour were clear favourites to hold at the by-election.

Labour decided to stand Denis MacShane, the director of the European Policy Institute.  A former journalist and trade union employee, he had unsuccessfully contested Solihull at the October 1974 general election.

The Conservative Party had taken a distant second place in 1992, and having lost the previous two by-elections of the term to the Liberal Democrats, they were not hopeful of gaining ground.  They chose to stand Nick Gibb, a chartered accountant working for KPMG.  The Liberal Democrats had taken less than one eighth of the votes cast in 1992, a significant decrease from the previous election.  Despite this, they stood the same candidate, David Wildgoose.

Two other candidates stood: Screaming Lord Sutch of the Official Monster Raving Loony Party, and Keith Laycock of the Natural Law Party.

Results
As expected, MacShane easily won the seat, although, disappointingly for the main opposition party, his vote was more than eight percent down on Boyce's. Wildgoose improved his fortunes, more than doubling his vote, and taking second place. Gibb took less than ten percent of the votes, falling to a distant third place. Sutch was able to record his best ever result, taking 1,114 votes and a 4.2% share - within a percentage point of the Loonies retaining a deposit for the first time.

At the 1997 general election, MacShane retained the seat, with an increased majority.  Wildgoose also stood, but proved unable to equal his performance in 1994, and by 2001 moved to contest Wentworth. At the Rotherham by-election of 2012, Wildgoose contested the seat again, though on this occasion as an English Democrat, ironically polling more votes than the Liberal Democrat candidate. Gibb became one of the few new Conservatives to enter Parliament in 1997, winning Bognor Regis and Littlehampton. Sutch stood in several subsequent by-elections, but was never able to beat his total in Rotherham.

References

United Kingdom Election Results 
UK by-election results since the 1992 general election

See also
Rotherham by-election for contests of 1899, 1910, 1917, 1976 and 2012

1994 elections in the United Kingdom
1994 in England
By-elections to the Parliament of the United Kingdom in South Yorkshire constituencies
Elections in Rotherham
1990s in South Yorkshire